Russian Easter Festival Overture: Overture on Liturgical Themes, Op. 36, also known as the Great Russian Easter Overture, is a concert overture written by the Russian composer Nikolai Rimsky-Korsakov between August 1887 and April 1888. It was dedicated to the memories of Modest Mussorgsky and Alexander Borodin, two members of the group of composers known in English as "The Five". It is the last of what many call his three most exceptionally brilliant orchestral works, preceded by Capriccio Espagnol and Scheherazade.

Instrumentation
The overture is scored for a Romantic period-sized orchestra, consisting of 3 flutes (1 doubling piccolo), 2 oboes, 2 clarinets in C, 2 bassoons, 4 horns in F, 2 trumpets in B, 3 trombones, tuba, 3 timpani tuned to A, D and G, percussion (glockenspiel, triangle, cymbals, bass drum, tam-tam), harp, and strings.

Background
The score is prefaced by two quotations from the Old and New Testaments and a third, written by the composer; these correspond to each of the overture's three parts. The first part is prefaced by two verses from Psalm 68:1–2; the second from the Gospel of Mark 16:1–6; and a third by a description of the Easter celebration written by the composer.

The melodies in the overture are largely from the Russian Orthodox liturgy, based on a collection of old Russian Orthodox liturgical chants called the Obikhod.

Rimsky-Korsakov said in his autobiography that he was eager to reproduce "the  legendary and heathen side of the holiday, the transition from the gloomy and mysterious evening of Passion Saturday to the unbridled pagan-religious merrymaking on Easter Sunday morning". He had always been interested in – and enjoyed – liturgical themes and music, though he was not a believer.

American musicologist Miloš Velimirović explains, "The Obikhod was like the Russian's Liber usualis...In 1848 it became mandatory for all of the Churches in Russia." Thus the Obikhod became associated with nationalism in Russia. The tunes that Rimsky chose from the Obikhod would carry a certain nationalistic and religious weight, and Russians would absolutely know them. The piece also appealed to the emotions of Russians because of its expression of the Easter Holiday, the high point of the liturgical calendar.

Professor Robert Greenberg describes the Russian Easter Festival Overture as, "A narrative story of a Russian Easter day from dawn until dusk." In Russian, Easter is known as the "Bright Holiday".

Structure
The Russian Easter Festival Overture is mainly in sonata allegro form, with a lengthy introduction at the beginning. Throughout the piece, there are a number of prominent solo sections, featuring violin, cello, trombone, clarinet, and flute.

The opening section is written in  time, and is one of the more famous works for orchestra in quintuple meter.

References

External links
 
 : Philadelphia Orchestra, Eugene Ormandy, conductor

Compositions by Nikolai Rimsky-Korsakov
Concert overtures
1888 compositions
Music for Easter